"Step Up" is the third single from  The Cheetah Girls 2 soundtrack.

Background and composition 
It officially premiered on Radio Disney on August 17, 2006. The single became available for download on iTunes on August 31 the same year. The song was written and produced by Matthew Gerard and Robbie Nevil.

Vocals 
This song is one of the tracks that features Raven-Symoné on lead. Symoné has two verses, one of them is a rap verse. Main adlibs by Adrienne Bailon, who had two solo verses, and additional adlibs by Symoné. Both Sabrina Bryan and Kiely Williams sings the title on the chorus, as well as having two solo verses each, with Bryan joining Symoné on the rap verse. Since Symoné did not participate on the girls' touring activities, Bryan did the rap verse with Symoné's solo. Williams then sings the main parts of the song with Bailon. Main adlibs and Symoné's are sung by Bailon and Bryan.

Backup Vocals are performed by Lauren Evans.

Music video 
The video for the song features the performance of "Step Up" in the movie and clips of the movie are intercut throughout the video. A clip of the video was shown on Live with Regis and Kelly two weeks prior to the actual premiere date of August 17, 2006 on Disney Channel.

Charts

References 

2006 singles
The Cheetah Girls songs
Dance-pop songs
Songs written for films
Songs written by Robbie Nevil
Songs written by Matthew Gerrard
Walt Disney Records singles
Song recordings produced by Robbie Nevil
2006 songs
Song recordings produced by Matthew Gerrard